Bhagyavantharu is a 1977 Indian Kannada-language drama film directed by H. R. Bhargava, making his debut. The film featured an ensemble cast including Rajkumar, B. Saroja Devi, Ashok, Balakrishna and Ramakrishna playing the pivotal roles. The film was produced by Dwarakish. The dialogues and lyrics were written by Chi. Udaya Shankar. The film featured original score and soundtrack composed by Rajan–Nagendra.Puneeth Rajkumar made a brief appearance in one of the songs of this film. The movie is a remake of 1974 Tamil movie Dheerga Sumangali.

Cast 

 Rajkumar as Kumar
 B. Saroja Devi as Parvathi
 Ashok as Ramu
 Balakrishna as Mahadevayya
 Ramakrishna as Arun
 Mynavathi as GunduRao's wife
 Thoogudeepa Srinivas as GunduRao
 M. S. Umesh
 Sampath
 M. S. Sathyu
 M. N. Lakshmi Devi as Parvathi's step mother
 Shashikala as Kumar's sister
 B. Jaya as Parvathamma
 Dwarakish as Subbu (Parvathi's step brother) in a guest appearance
 Gurudath Musuri as young Ramu

Soundtrack

The music was composed by Rajan–Nagendra, with lyrics by Chi. Udaya Shankar.

References

External links 
 
 Raaga info

1977 films
1970s Kannada-language films
Indian romantic drama films
1977 romantic drama films
Films scored by Rajan–Nagendra
1977 directorial debut films
Films directed by H. R. Bhargava
Kannada remakes of Tamil films